The 4th Ryder Cup Matches were held 26–27 June 1933 at the Southport and Ainsdale Golf Club in Southport, England. The Great Britain team won the competition by a score of 6–5 points, which at the time was the closest score possible other than a tie. As with the three previous events, the host team won and the series was tied at two wins each.

John Henry Taylor became only the second of three Team Great Britain captains to ever lift the Ryder Cup and was Great Britain's last Ryder Cup victory until 1957, the only post-war win until Team Europe won its first in 1985.

Format
The Ryder Cup is a match play event, with each match worth one point.  From 1927 through 1959, the format consisted of 4 foursome (alternate shot) matches on the first day and 8 singles matches on the second day, for a total of 12 points.  Therefore, 6 points were required to win the Cup.  All matches were played to a maximum of 36 holes.

Teams
Source: 

In February 1931, it was announced that a selection committee of six would choose the Great Britain team for the 1933 Ryder Cup. A preliminary squad of 22 was announced. Henry Cotton was not considered as he was employed in Belgium.

In early June, the team of ten was selected (as below). J.H. Taylor was to be the non-playing captain. Initially Easterbrook and Havers were called "reserves" but the distinction was ignored when choosing those who actually played in the matches.

The American team did not arrive in the UK until 21 June. They travelled to London and arrived in Southport the following day.

All the Americans competed in the 1933 Open Championship. They all qualified and 8 of the 10 made the cut. After the four rounds they held 5 of the 6 leading positions with Shute and Wood tying for the tead. Shute won the 36 hole play-off by 5 strokes.

Monday's foursome matches
After the morning matches Great Britain led three of the four matches with the other match level. Alliss and Whitcombe had extended their lead to four after eight holes of the afternoon round. Sarazen and Hagen then won the next three holes and levelled the match at the 16th. The British pair won the 17th but Whitcombe missed a 4-foot putt at the last and the match was halved. In the final match the American pair of Dudley and Burke levelled the match after six holes of the afternoon round having been four behind at lunch. They won the 17th and halved the last to win the match.

18 hole scores: Alliss/Whitcombe: 3 up, Mitchell/Haver: 4 up, Davies/Easterbrook v Wood/Runyan: all square, Padgham/Perry: 4 up.

Tuesday's singles matches
Dutra was 3 up on Mitchell after 10 holes but Mitchell then won eight holes in a hole to be 5 up at lunch. At the 18th Dutra was stymied and, attempting to chip over Mitchell's ball, knocked Mitchell's ball into the hole. At lunch each team was up in three matches with the other two matches level. In the afternoon play the first two matches finished quickly with wins for Sarazen and Mitchell. Lacey and Hagen were level after 14 holes but Hagen won the next two and eventually won 2 & 1.  Alliss and Havers won their matches for Great Britain and after Whitcombe lost at the 17th, all depended on the Easterbrook/Shute match. The match was all square playing the last and both players took three to reach the green. Shute's first putt was strong and he missed the return putt from 4 feet. Easterbrook had also missed his first putt but, when he holed his short second putt, Great Britain had secured the narrowest of wins. If Shute had holed his putt the match would have ended as a tie and the United States, as defending champions, would have retained the cup.

18 hole scores: Sarazen: 2 up, Mitchell: 5 up, Lacey: 1 up, Davies v Wood: all square, Alliss: 1 up, Havers v Diegel: all square, Shute: 1 up, Smith: 5 up.

Individual player records
Each entry refers to the win–loss–half record of the player.

Source:

Great Britain

Allan Dailey did not play in any matches.

United States

References

External links

PGA of America: 1933 Ryder Cup 
About.com 1933 Ryder Cup

Ryder Cup
Golf tournaments in England
Sport in Southport
Ryder Cup
Ryder Cup
Ryder Cup
20th century in Lancashire